Rennesøy is an island in Stavanger municipality in Rogaland county, Norway.  The  island lies on the south side of the Boknafjorden, surrounded by several other islands.  The islands of Mosterøy, Klosterøy, and Åmøy lie to the south and Finnøy and Talgje lie to the northeast.  The villages of Vikevåg and Sørbø are both located on the island.  The Hausken Church is located in Vikevåg and the 900-year old Sørbø Church is located in Sørbø.

Since 1992, the island is connected to the mainland city of Stavanger by a series of bridges and tunnels that are part of the European route E39 highway: the Mastrafjord Tunnel, the Askjesund Bridge, and the Byfjord Tunnel.  The island of Rennesøy is also connected to the islands of Finnøy and Talgje to the northeast by the Finnøy Tunnel.

The western part of the island is relatively flat and well cultivated.

In 2020, the island became part of Stavanger municipality. Before that time, it was part of Rennesøy municipality.

See also
List of islands of Norway

References

Islands of Stavanger